Andixius nupta, is a species of planthoppers belonging to the family Cixiidae. It is endemic to Japan.

Body and antennae yellowish brown. Left side of periandrium with a bifurcate process medially. Left-ventral margin with a reversed process.

References

External links

Insects described in 2007
Cixiidae